Semutophila saccharopa is a moth of the family Tortricidae. It is found in Thailand and Malaysia.

The larvae live in silken shelters fixed to the leaves of bamboo. In response to mechanical stimuli from ants, they discharge an anal liquid that contains sugar and amino acids which is used as a food source by these ants.

References

Moths described in 1986
Olethreutini